Lauren Jane Moss (born 6 May 1987) is an Australian politician. She has been the Labor member for Casuarina in the Northern Territory Legislative Assembly since a by-election held on 18 October 2014 to replace Kon Vatskalis. She is the youngest ever member of Northern Territory Parliament. Prior to entering politics she was a youth advocate.

Early life

Born in Crewe in the United Kingdom, Moss has lived in the Northern Territory since emigrating to Australia in 1999. She has a Bachelor of Business from Charles Darwin University and Monash University. Before entering politics, she ran a small business and worked in mental health services.

She won an  Excellence in Youth Leadership award at the NT Young Achiever Awards and the NT Pride of Australia Young Leader Medal. She was also a finalist in the NT Young Australian of the Year, Darwin City Council Young Citizen of the Year and the Australian Woman's Weekly Women of the Future.

Politics

|}

Moss is the youngest ever member of the Northern Territory Parliament and is the second member of Indian descent. Moss' grandfather was from India and migrated to England.

Member for Casuarina
Moss became the Member for Casuarina at a by-election held on 18 October 2014 to replace Kon Vatskalis who retired. She was re-elected at the 2016 Northern Territory Election. She is currently the Minister for Corporate and Information Services and Minister for Tourism and Culture.

References

1987 births
Living people
Australian Labor Party members of the Northern Territory Legislative Assembly
Members of the Northern Territory Legislative Assembly
Charles Darwin University alumni
Monash University alumni
English emigrants to Australia
People from Crewe
Australian people of Indian descent
English people of Indian descent
21st-century Australian politicians
Women members of the Northern Territory Legislative Assembly
21st-century Australian women politicians